is a black-and-white two-part jidaigeki Japanese film directed by Kenji Mizoguchi, adapted from a play by Seika Mayama. The first part was released on December 1, 1941 with the second part being released on February 11 of the following year. The film depicts the legendary forty-seven Ronin and their plot to avenge the death of their lord, Asano Naganori, by killing Kira Yoshinaka, a shogunate official responsible for Asano being forced to commit seppuku.

Plot 
The plot revolves around the consequences of an attack by Lord Asano Naganori on Lord Kira Yoshinaka, an influential court official in the Tokugawa Shogunate. After overhearing Kira insult him in public, Asano strikes Kira with a sword in the corridors of Edo Castle, but succeeds only in wounding him. As attacking a Shogunate official is a grave offense, Shogun Tokugawa Tsunayoshi sentences Asano to commit seppuku and issues an edict stripping the Asano Clan of their lands and wealth. Kira, meanwhile, is not punished by the Shogun because, it is thought, of family connections. As a result of the Shogun's judgement, all samurai loyal to the Asano Clan become rōnin while the late Lord Asano's family is ruined. Many of the rōnin wish to seek revenge against Kira for the dishonor of their Lord, but their leader, Ōishi Kuranosuke, convinces them to wait while he first petitions the Shogun to restore the Asano Clan. When the Shogun refuses his request, Ōishi and the other forty-six rōnin begin planning their revenge. But because Kira has surrounded himself with warriors in his residence, Ōishi first disarms suspicion by posing as a drunkard and womanizer, to his own dishonor, and goes to the length of divorcing his wife.

Almost two years after the death of Asano, the forty-seven assemble in Edo and stage an attack on Kira's residence, resulting in Kira and several of his followers being killed. This is not shown on the screen but is reported in a letter to Asano's wife, who has returned to her father. After laying Kira's head on Asano's grave and formally making a report of their actions before it, the forty-seven turn themselves in to the authorities. There is sympathy for the rōnin for their faithfulness and sacrifice in such difficult circumstances and the forty-seven are granted the honorable death of committing seppuku despite their act of defiance. This comes at the end of some months' deliberation and is greeted with singing and dancing by the warriors. Each is then summoned down the corridors of the castle to enact the sentence; Ōishi is left until last and courteously excuses himself to the visitor to his room when his turn comes.

Cast 
Actors in the film include:
 Chōjuro Kawarasaki as 
 Kanemon Nakamura as 
 Kunitarō Kawarazaki as 
 Chōemon Bandō as 
 Sukezō Sukedakaya as 
 Kikunojo Segawa as 
 Utaemon Ichikawa as 
 Yoshizaburō Arashi as 
 Kazutoyo Mimasu as 
 Tokusaburō Arashi as 
 Masao Shimizu as 

Uncredited
 Seizaburō Kawazu as 

Inception
During the war, Kenji Mizoguchi was forced to make artistic compromises, producing propaganda for the military government. In 1941, the Japanese military commissioned him to make Genroku Chūshingura. They wanted a ferocious morale booster based on the familiar rekishi geki ("historical drama") of The Loyal 47 Ronin. Instead, Mizoguchi chose for his source Mayama Chūshingura, a cerebral play dealing with the story. The government foisted the project on the director as a wartime morale booster, and as justification for the expansionist, nationalistic, and ultimately suicidal world war that Japan was embroiled in during the middle of the 20th century.

Reception
Part One was a commercial failure at a cost of ¥530,000, having been released in Japan one week before the attack on Pearl Harbor. The Japanese military and most audiences found the first part to be too serious, but the studio and Mizoguchi both regarded it as so important that Part Two was put into production, despite lukewarm reception for Part One. The film wasn't shown in America until the 1970s.

See also 
 The Loyal 47 Ronin (忠臣蔵 Chushingura) – 1958 film by Kunio Watanabe, Daiei star-studded cast
 Akō Rōshi – 1961 film by Sadatsugu Matsuda, Toei star-studded cast
 Chushingura: Hana no Maki, Yuki no Maki – 1962 color film directed by Hiroshi Inagaki, Toho star-studded cast
 Daichūshingura (大忠臣蔵, Daichūshingura) – 1971 television dramatization
 The Fall of Ako Castle (赤穂城断絶, Akō-jō danzetsu) (aka Swords Of Vengeance) – 1978 film by Kinji Fukasaku
 Matsu no Ōrōka
List of historical drama films of Asia

References

External links 
 
 
 

1941 films
Japanese black-and-white films
1940s Japanese-language films
Films about the Forty-seven Ronin
Japanese films based on plays
Films directed by Kenji Mizoguchi
Jidaigeki films
Samurai films
Films with screenplays by Yoshikata Yoda
Shochiku films
1940s martial arts films
Japanese action films
1940s action films